Letters to a Young Poet (original title, in German: Briefe an einen jungen Dichter) is a collection of ten letters written by Bohemian-Austrian poet Rainer Maria Rilke (1875–1926) to Franz Xaver Kappus (1883–1966), a 19-year-old officer cadet at the Theresian Military Academy in Wiener Neustadt. Rilke, the son of an Austrian army officer, had studied at the academy's lower school at Sankt Pölten in the 1890s. Kappus corresponded with the popular poet and author from 1902 to 1908 seeking his advice as to the quality of his poetry, and in deciding between a literary career or a career as an officer in the Austro-Hungarian Army. Kappus compiled and published the letters in 1929—three years after Rilke's death from leukemia.

In the first letter, Rilke respectfully declines to review or criticize Kappus' poetry, advising the younger Kappus that "Nobody can advise you and help you, nobody. There is only one way. Go into yourself." Rilke, over the course of the ten letters, proceeds to advise Kappus on how a poet should feel, love, and seek truth in trying to understand and experience the world around him and engage the world of art. These letters offer insight into the ideas and themes that appear in Rilke's poetry and his working process. Further, these letters were written during a key period of Rilke's early artistic development after his reputation as a poet began to be established with the publication of parts of Das Stunden-Buch (The Book of Hours) and Das Buch der Bilder (The Book of Images).

Writing and publication

Correspondence with Rilke
In 1929, Franz Xaver Kappus compiled ten letters that he received from Rainer Maria Rilke that were written from 1902 to 1908 and published them under the title Briefe an einen jungen Dichter (Letters to a Young Poet) through Insel Verlag in Leipzig. Later information revealed that Rilke and Kappus did meet in person.

In an introduction to the collection, Kappus recounts how he came to write to Rainer Maria Rilke. According to Kappus, in late 1902 while a student at the Theresian Military Academy in Wiener Neustadt in Lower Austria, he was reading Rilke's poetry. He was approached by the academy's chaplain, Horacek, who noted that Rilke had been a pupil years earlier at the academy's lower school at Sankt Pölten. Horacek expressed surprise that the former pupil had "become a poet" and described to Kappus the young Rilke as a "thin, pale boy" whose quiet demeanor proved unable to bear the strain of a military education and life. Rilke did not continue his military education. At the time that Kappus learned this he was inclined toward writing and was not very keen on the notion of dedicating his life to the military. Kappus then decided to write to Rilke for advice.

When Kappus wrote his first letter to Rilke he asked for Rilke to provide a critique of his poetry. Rilke provided the young Kappus very little in criticism or in suggestions for his improvement as a poet. Instead, Rilke discouraged Kappus from reading criticism and advised him to trust his inner judgment, commenting that "Nobody can advise you and help you. Nobody. There is only one way—Go into yourself." Rilke provided advice that inspired Kappus to search broader issues of intimacy and the nature of beauty and art, as well as probing philosophical and existential questions. The letters address personal issues that Kappus had apparently revealed to Rilke; ranging from atheism, loneliness, and career choices.

The originally published collection does not include Kappus's letters to Rilke, though the original German collection does include one sonnet of Kappus's own that Rilke sent back to him in Rilke's handwriting with the instruction to "Read the lines as if they were unknown to you, and you will feel in your inmost self how very much they are yours." However, in 2017, the letters from Kappus to Rilke were found in the Rilke family archive. Kappus's letters were published in German in 2019, and an English translation was published in 2020.

Rilke's influence on Kappus

Aside from his role in writing to Rilke and later publishing these letters, Franz Xaver Kappus (1883–1966) is largely forgotten by history. Kappus was descended from a Banat Swabian (ethnic German) family born in Timișoara, in the Banat region, now divided between Hungary, Serbia and Romania. Despite the hesitancy he expressed in his letters to Rilke about pursuing a military career, he continued his military studies and served for 15 years as an officer in the Austro-Hungarian Army. During the course of his life, he worked as a newspaper editor and journalist, writing poems, humorous sketches, short-stories, novels, and adapted several works (including his own) into screenplays for films in the 1930s. However, Kappus did not achieve lasting fame.

The Letters

The first letter
Written in Paris, France on 17 February 1903 – Theme of letter: Criticism fails to "touch a work of art." Rilke urges his reader to eschew others' opinions of his poetry. Instead, the young poet should look inward and examine what truly motivates him to continue writing. Rilke expands on the theme of developing a rich inner life and offers an inspiring perspective on the process of creating art.

References

External links

Rainer Maria Rilke – Letters to a Young Poet – The first letter (full text in: EN FR DE IT ES CH)
The Letters (German): 1, 2, 3, 4, 5, 6, 7, 8, 9, 10.
Online text source

German books
Austro-Hungarian culture
Collections of letters
Books about poetry
Works by Rainer Maria Rilke
1929 non-fiction books